This page lists board and card games, wargames, miniatures games, and tabletop role-playing games published in 1987.  For video games, see 1987 in video gaming.

Games released or invented in 1987

Game awards given in 1987
 Spiel des Jahres: Auf Achse - Wolfgang Kramer, F.X. Schmid

See also
 1987 in video gaming

Games
Games by year